Phylloporia is a genus of polypore fungi in the family Hymenochaetaceae. A 2012 estimate placed 23 species in the genus; this number was increased to 30 by 2015.

Species
Phylloporia afrospathulata Yombiyeni & Decock 2015 – Gabon
Phylloporia ampelina (Bondartsev & Singer) Bondartseva 1983
Phylloporia bibulosa  (Lloyd) Ryvarden 1972 – East Africa
Phylloporia capucina  (Mont.) Ryvarden 1982
Phylloporia chrysites  (Berk.) Ryvarden 1972 – Africa; Puerto Rico; South America
Phylloporia clausenae – China
Phylloporia crataegi  L.W.Zhou & Y.C.Dai 2012 – northeastern China
Phylloporia cylindrispora – China
Phylloporia dependens Y.C.Dai 2015
Phylloporia ephedrae (Woron.) Parmasto 1985
Phylloporia fontanesiae  L.W.Zhou & Y.C.Dai 2012 – China
Phylloporia flacourtiae – China
Phylloporia fruticum  (Berk. & M.A.Curtis) Ryvarden 1972 – Africa; Cuba; southeast Asia; South America
Phylloporia fulva Yombiyeni & Decock – northwestern Gabon
Phylloporia gutta  L.W.Zhou & Y.C.Dai 2012 – China
Phylloporia hainaniana  Y.C.Dai & B.K.Cui 2010
Phylloporia homocarnica – China
Phylloporia minutispora Ipulet & Ryvarden 2005 – Uganda
Phylloporia nandinae  L.W.Zhou & Y.C.Dai 2012 – China
Phylloporia nouraguensis  Decock & Castillo 2013 – French Guiana
Phylloporia oblongospora  Y.C.Dai & H.S.Yuan 2010 – China
Phylloporia oreophila L.W.Zhou & Y.C.Dai 2012 – China
Phylloporia osmanthi L.W.Zhou 2014 – South China
Phylloporia parasitica Murrill 1904 – South America
Phylloporia pectinata  (Klotzsch) Ryvarden 1991 – New South Wales; Philippines; Malaysia
Phylloporia pulla (Mont. & Berk.) Decock & Yombiyeni – Indonesia
Phylloporia resupinata  Douanla-Meli & Ryvarden 2007 – Cameroon
Phylloporia ribis (Schumach.) Ryvarden 1978 – Europe
Phylloporia rzedowskii R.Valenz. & Decock 2011 – Mexico
Phylloporia spathulata (Hook.) Ryvarden 1991 – central Africa; South America; Philippines
Phylloporia terrestris L.W.Zhou 2014 – South China
Phylloporia tiliae L.W.Zhou 2013 – China
Phylloporia ulloai  R.Valenz., Raymundo, Cifuentes & Decock 2011 – Mexico
Phylloporia verae-crucis (Berk. ex Sacc.) Ryvarden 1991
Phylloporia yuchengia Yu.Sh.Gafforov, Tomovsk, E.Langer & L.W.Zhou 2014 – Uzbekistan
Phylloporia weberiana

References

Hymenochaetaceae
Agaricomycetes genera